Labidoherpia is a genus of cavibelonian solenogasters, shell-less, worm-like, marinemollusks in the subfamily Pruvotininae  of the family Pruvotinidae.

Species
 Labidoherpia lucus Pedrouzo, García-Álvarez & Urgorri, 2022
 Labidoherpia spinosa (Thiele, 1913)

References

 Salvini-Plawen, L. von. (1978). Antarktische und subantarktische Solenogastres (eine Monographie: 1898-1974). Zoologica (Stuttgart). 128: 1-305
 García-Álvarez O. & Salvini-Plawen L.v. (2007). Species and diagnosis of the families and genera of Solenogastres (Mollusca). Iberus 25(2): 73-143

Cavibelonia